The thinlip mullet (Chelon ramada)  is a species of fish in the family Mugilidae. It is found in shallow European waters and is a migratory species.

Description
The thin lip mullet has an elongate body compressed laterally. The head is short and flattened and the mouth is broad with a narrow upper lip and no tubercles. There are two dorsal fins. It is steely blue above and paler beneath. The scales are large and there is no externally visible lateral line.

Its maximum length is around 70  cm, with the common specimen being around 35  cm. The largest specimens recorded weighed over three kilograms.

Spawning takes place at sea, near the coast between September and February.

Distribution
The thinlip mullet is found in the eastern Atlantic Ocean from Cape Verde and Senegal north to the Baltic Sea. It is also found in the Mediterranean Sea, Black Sea and Azov Sea.

It is a pelagic species, usually occurring inshore, entering lagoons and estuaries, and rivers. It feeds on epiphytic algae, detritus, and small benthic or planktonic organisms. It is common between 0-10m, rarely deeper than that.

Fishing
Thinlip mullet is commercially caught mainly with gill nets, trammel nets, beach seines and sometimes cast nets. In recreational fishing, spearguns and rods and reels with floats are used. Hooks are baited with bread, various pastes, fish guts and similar baits. One must be careful when pulling and reeling in larger mullets since hooks can sometimes hook only soft lips and catch can be easily lost.

Cuisine
Meat is white, tender and very soft. Since Thinlip mullet can be found in polluted waters too, taste and quality of the meat vary. Specimen caught in clear waters have great taste and can be prepared in many ways. It is the best barbecued with some olive oil and lemon juice and as part of mixed fish stew with boiled potatoes and/or polenta.

References

External links

thinlip mullet
Fish of Europe
Fish of the Mediterranean Sea
Fish of West Africa
Marine fauna of North Africa
Fauna of Macaronesia
Taxa named by Antoine Risso
thinlip mullet